The Leopold Canal is a flood-relief canal in the German state of Baden-Württemberg.

Canals in Germany
Canals opened in 1843
CLeopold
1843 establishments in Germany